Eighteen Visions is the fifth studio album by Eighteen Visions that was released on July 18, 2006.  It was the band's only album released on Epic Records. This album saw the band take a step away from its metalcore roots in favor of a new, more melodic tone. Some countries have added two bonus tracks. One is taken from a Truskill records compilation called "Trustkill Takeover Volume II". The second is a re-recorded version of the track "Prelude To An Epic" from their album Until the Ink Runs Out. The album has sold around 100,000+ copies in the U.S. The album peaked at #74 in the U.S. Billboard chart.

Track listing
All tracks by Eighteen Visions
"Our Darkest Days" - 2:52
"Victim" - 3:00
"Truth or Consequence" - 4:15
"Burned us Alive" - 3:43
"Black and Bruised" - 3:21
"Broken Hearted" - 4:06
"Pretty Suicide" - 4:16
"Coma" - 3:36
"The Sweetest Memory" - 4:10
"Last Night" - 3:38
"Your Nightmare" - 3:30
"Tonightless" - 5:40

Bonus tracks:
13. "All We've Got" - 3:39
14. "The Epic" (Re-Recording of "Prelude To An Epic") - 2:29

Featured in
Both "Victim" and "Black and Bruised" were featured in the sportbike freestyle DVD, Mass Mayhem 3, produced by Evil Twins Productions.

Personnel
James Hart - lead vocals, lyrics
Kenneth Floyd - rhythm guitar, lead guitar, piano, keyboards, backing vocals
Keith Barney - lead guitar, rhythm guitar, piano, keyboards, backing vocals
Mick Morris - bass, backing vocals
Trevor Friedrich - drums, percussion
Drum Tech - Ken Floyd

References

Eighteen Visions albums
2006 albums
Epic Records albums
Trustkill Records albums
Albums produced by Machine (producer)